"(You Make Me Want to Be a) Mother" is a song written by Billy Sherrill and Norro Wilson, and recorded by American country music artist Tammy Wynette. It was released in January 1975 as a single from her compilation album Tammy's Greatest Hits, Vol. 3.

Background and reception
"(You Make Me Want to Be a) Mother" was first recorded in November 1969 at the Columbia Recording Studio in Nashville, Tennessee. Two additional tracks were recorded during this session including the single's B-side. The recording session was produced by Billy Sherrill, Wynette's long-time producer.

The song reached number 4 on the Billboard Hot Country Singles chart in 1975.

Track listings
7" vinyl single
 "(You Make Me Want to Be a) Mother" – 2:22
 "I'm Not a Has Been (I Just Never Was)" – 2:46

Charts

Weekly charts

Year-end charts

References

1975 songs
1975 singles
Tammy Wynette songs
Song recordings produced by Billy Sherrill
Songs written by Billy Sherrill
Songs written by Norro Wilson
Epic Records singles